Charles Frederick Ralph Shaw (13 August 1913 – 10 September 1996) was a British author and journalist.

Although he was born in Nuneaton, Warwickshire, he always considered himself a Yorkshireman. He was the older of two boys and grew up in Keighley and Rugby. He maintained various jobs after leaving school, one as a local journalist for the Rugby Advertiser and subsequently on the North China Daily News, Shanghai from 1937 to 1949.

He wrote his first book Sin City as a result of his experiences as a journalist and a Japanese prisoner of war in Shanghai, China. He spent many years of his life living and working abroad as a journalist in Shanghai, China, Brunei, Pakistan, Kuwait and the United Arab Emirates. In 1976 his second book, Kuwait, was published by Macmillan. This was a highly informative book about Kuwait describing the transformation of the country over a 25-year period.

He died on 10 September 1996 and is buried in Kent. He was married and had one daughter.

1913 births
1996 deaths
English writers
English male journalists
World War II prisoners of war held by Japan
British World War II prisoners of war
People from Nuneaton